Johannes Bertelius [also Jean Bertels] (1544 – June 19, 1607), abbot of Echternach and writer of a history of Luxembourg, was born in Leuven.

After obtaining a degree in philosophy at the Pedagogy of the Lily in Leuven University, Bertelius was elected abbot of Altmünster Abbey, Luxembourg, in 1573 and was consecrated in 1576. On his orders the relics of John the Blind, Duke of Luxembourg and King of Bohemia, were buried there. In 1595 king Philip II of Spain appointed him abbot of the Benedictine monastery of St. Willibrord at Echternach.

The following year the abbey was pillaged by Dutch freebooters and Bertelius was taken prisoner and removed to Nijmegen. He was released only after a ransom payment. After his return, he devoted himself to literary work until his death. He was buried in a chapel of the monastery at Echternach.

Works
In 1581, Bertelius published a catalogue of the abbots of the Altmünster abbey and his Dialogi XXVI in regulam S. Benedicti. In 1595, the Catalogus et series episcoporum Epternacensium was printed. The year 1606 saw the publication of a treatise on the pagan gods worshipped by the ancient Germanic tribes (Deorum sacrifiorumque gentilium descriptio). The main work by Bertelius, however, is the Historia Luxemburgensis, printed in Cologne in 1605. This was the first history of Luxembourg.

Apart from the Latin works by Bertelius, there exists a collection of drawings made by him which has been edited by Paul Spang.

References
Short online biography of Bertelius
Brimmeyr, J.P. (1923) Geschichte der Stadt und der Abtei Echternach, 3 vols., Imprimerie centrale Gustave Soupert (Luxemburg), vol. 2: Zweite Hälfte des zweiten Teiles, begreifend den Zeitraum 1298-1797, pp. 66–80
Neyen, C.-A. (1860-1876) ‘Bertels, Jean’, in: id., Biographie luxembourgeoise. Histoire des hommes distingués originaires de ce pays considéré á l’époque de sa plus grande étendu ou qui se sont rendus remarquables pendant le séjour qu’ils y ont fait, 2 vols., Pierre Bruck (Luxembourg), vol. 1, pp. 62–5
Spang, P. (1984) Bertels abbas delineavit (1544-1607), RTL/Édition (Luxembourg)
 Sprunck, A. (1955) ‘Bertels, Johann’, in: Historischen Kommission bei der Bayerischen Akademie der Wissenschaften (ed.), Neue deutsche Biographie, Duncker & Humblot (Berlin), vol. 2, p. 149

1544 births
1607 deaths
16th-century Latin-language writers
17th-century Latin-language writers
Abbots of Echternach
16th-century Luxembourgian historians
Renaissance humanists
17th-century Luxembourgian historians